Saj bread or tava bread is unleavened flatbread in Middle Eastern and South Asian cuisines baked on a metal griddle, called saj in Arabic and tava in the Indian subcontinent (concave in India and convex in Pakistan).

Types

Middle East

Bread
Yufka bread is the Turkish name of a very thin, large unleavened flatbread in Turkish cuisine, also known under different names in Arab cuisine, baked on a convex metal griddle, called saj in Arabic and saç in Turkish.

Arab saj bread is somewhat similar to markook shrek, but is thinner and larger.

In Palestine, the saj bread is simply called shrāke, differing from the markook, which is baked in a clay oven (tannur).

Stuffed bread
Gözleme is a savory, soft Turkish stuffed flatbread, cooked on the convex saç.

Indian sub-continent

Tava roti bread
Tava roti is a roti cooked on a tava.

Gallery

See also

 Markook, another bread called "saj bread"
 Chapati
 List of flatbreads

References

External links
  (Arabic)
Iranian breads
Flatbreads
Turkish cuisine
Arab cuisine
Iranian cuisine